Dale Allen Pfeiffer (March 30, 1958) is a geologist and writer from Michigan, U.S. who investigated and wrote about energy depletion and potential future resource wars. He also wrote about class war, sustainability, direct action and the environment. He is also an anarchist activist and a member of the Industrial Workers of the World. In 1999, he was one of the organizers of a hunger strike to provide medical care for the incarcerated Leonard Peltier.

In 2001 he began writing articles regarding energy at From The Wilderness.  In 2003 he wrote their often cited article on peak oil and food production titled Eating Fossil Fuels.  In 2005 he ended his association with the website and its founder, Michael C. Ruppert.  In 2006, he expanded the Eating Fossil Fuels article into a book.

Pfeiffer believed that energy depletion will have a major impact upon the socioeconomic system that will not be resolved by turning to renewable energy alone. Through mathematical modeling, he predicted that energy consumption has grown to the point that we will never sustain our current consumption levels without plentiful and cheap fossil fuels.

He argued that we must cut our consumption, abandoning the current socioeconomic system in favor of re-localization, sustainability and decentralization. He believed it is possible for human society to achieve equitable, sustainable stability while maintaining a reasonable quality of life. To reach this goal, he recommended direct action on a grassroots level, as opposed to a reliance upon government and business.

In 2007, he retired from writing nonfiction. Since that time, he has been busy writing fiction under a pen name (PD Allen).

Published books

 The Eighth Tier (2003)
 The End of the Oil Age (2004)
 Eating Fossil Fuels: Oil, Food and the Coming Crisis in Agriculture (2006), New Society Publishers
 Blood Moon (Tales of da Yoopernatural, Volume 1) (2009)
 The Secret Life of Trees (Tales of da Yoopernatural, Volume 2) (2010)
 Afraid of the Dark (Tales of da Yoopernatural, Volume 3) (2010)
 Giants in Their Steps (2010)

See also
Colin J. Campbell
Kenneth S. Deffeyes
Richard Heinberg
Matthew R. Simmons
Michael Ruppert

References

External links
 From the Wilderness 
 The Complete Mountain Sentinel 
 Another Leonard Peltier fast statement 
 The Nature of Action 
 How Much Energy do We Consume? 
 List of published books by Dale Allen Pfeiffer/PD Allen 

Sustainability advocates
Industrial Workers of the World members
Living people
1958 births